Andrew Charles John White (born 6 November 1948) is a Welsh former footballer who played as a winger. He played for Newport County in the Football League.

Career
Born in Newport, Monmouthshire, White joined hometown club Newport County in August 1969 from local club Caerleon. He went on to make 254 appearances in the Football League for Newport, scoring 26 goals. In 1977, he joined Minehead.

References

1948 births
Living people
Footballers from Newport, Wales
Welsh footballers
Association football wingers
Newport County A.F.C. players
English Football League players
Minehead A.F.C. players